Estadio de Atletismo de Albacete is a sports facility in the  city of Albacete, in Spain. It is owned by the University of Castilla-La Mancha and managed by the Albacete City Council through the Municipal Sports Institute (IMD)

The stadium is located at the Universidad neighbourhood of Albacete. Inaugurated in 1999, the stadium has a capacity of 1000 spectators.

The stadium has an homologated athletics track with eight marks, a rugby field with natural grass, a sand pit for jumping, a zone for javelin, discus and hammer throw, and a fitness room, as well as the stands, a meeting room and a control tower.

It is the home stadium of various sports clubs of the city, such as Club de Atletismo Albacete and Club de Rugby Albacete.

See also 
 University city of Albacete
 Albacete

References 

Rugby union stadiums in Spain
Athletics (track and field) venues in Spain
Sports venues in Castilla–La Mancha
Sports venues completed in 1999
Buildings and structures in Albacete
Sport in Albacete